Whitefield–KSR Bengaluru City MEMU is a MEMU train of the Indian Railways, which runs between Whitefield railway station and Bangalore City railway station in Karnataka. It is currently being operated with 66541UP/66542DN train numbers on Daily basis.

Route and halts

The important halts of the train are:

Average speed and frequency

The 66541/Whitefield–KSR Bengaluru MEMU runs with an average speed of 35 km/h and completes 23 km in 3h 5m. The 66542/KSR Bengaluru–Whitefield MEMU runs with an average speed of 25 km/h and completes 23 km in 55m.

See also 

 Bangalore City railway station
 Whitefield railway station
 Bangalore City–Kolar DEMU (via Chikkaballapur)
 Bangalore City–Dharmapuri DEMU

Notes

References

External links 

 66541/Whitefield-KSR Bengaluru MEMU
 66542/KSR Bengaluru-Whitefield MEMU

Transport in Bangalore
Rail transport in Karnataka
Electric multiple units of India